Brand New War are an American punk rock/street punk band from Los Angeles, California, United States, who began their career as The God Awfuls. As the God Awfuls, their music was described as "pedestrian political punk rock." The song, "Watch It Fall", from The God Awfuls album, Next Stop Armageddon was featured on the 2005 skateboarding video game, Tony Hawk's American Wasteland. It was produced by The Greedy Bros. (a.k.a. Blag Dahlia of The Dwarves). The God Awfuls appeared in the 2007 documentary Punk's Not Dead. In July 2008, The God Awfuls released three new songs on a demo. On October 28, 2008, The God Awfuls announced on their MySpace page they had changed their name to Brand New War.

References

External links
The God Awfuls on Myspace
Brand New War on Myspace

Street punk groups
Punk rock groups from California